Pullivasal Island is an uninhabited island in the Gulf of Mannar situated south of Pamban Island. The island belongs to India and forms a part of the Gulf of Mannar Marine National Park. The area of sea grass beds along the coast is 5.89 square kilometres.

References 

 

Islands of Tamil Nadu
Uninhabited islands of India
Islands of India